Qaṭma, or Qatmet Efrin is a village in northwestern Syria, within Afrin District (Aleppo Governorate). It is also within Afrin Canton, "de facto" autonomous since January 2014. It lies northeast of Afrin and west of Azaz. According to the Syria Central Bureau of Statistics, Qaṭma had a population of 1,215 in the 2004 census. On March 7, 2018, the town came under the control of the Syrian National Army.

Religions
Qatma consists of Islam and Yezidism. In addition to a mosque, there are two holy places in proximity to the village.

Economy 
Agriculture is the main source of income of the population in the village: olives, grain, chickpeas and grapes are cultivated there, in addition, figs, cherries and further fruits. The work is mainly done with modern agricultural machines, for example tractors and combines. It is very important that olives are pressed in the village's own olive presses. In the village are some restaurants, which offer facilities for weddings,
etc.

Traffic
In the village there is a railway station at which travelers board for Aleppo or Turkey. There are many cars and trucks in the village.

Education
The illiteracy rate has been reduced to a minimum, to the point where only the most elderly cannot read or write. The first school in Qatma was established in the middle of the 1940s. At that time there was only one teacher, who instructed three/four classes. At present the school maintains some 100 pupils, up to the ninth class, who are instructed by several teachers, including particular subject teachers, with classes taught in Arabic, English and French.

Climate 
Qatma is situated in the subtropics, where there are also winter rains. The village is approximately 80 km distant from the Mediterranean; it is set on the Kurd Mountains, also called Kurd-Dagh, at elevations near 600m.

References

Populated places in Afrin District
Kurdish communities in Syria
Villages in Aleppo Governorate
Yazidi villages in Syria